Hamza is a genus of cicadas in the family Cicadidae. There is at least one described species in Hamza, H. ciliaris.

References

Further reading

 
 
 
 

Cicadidae genera
Platypleurini